The Ambassador of Ireland to Malaysia is the head of Ireland's diplomatic mission to Malaysia, and the official representative of the Government of Ireland to the Government of Malaysia. The position has the rank and status of an Ambassador Extraordinary and Plenipotentiary and is based in the Embassy of Ireland, Kuala Lumpur.

The incumbent Ambassador is Hilary Reilly who was appointed on 3 October 2019.

History

In 1995, Ireland opened a resident Embassy in Malaysia. It was Ireland's first ever resident Embassy in Southeast Asia. Ever since, the Embassy has been located in the Amp Walk Building on Jalan Ampang.

List of ambassadors

See also 
 Ireland-Malaysia relations

External links

References 

 
Malaysia
Ireland
Ireland and the Commonwealth of Nations
Malaysia and the Commonwealth of Nations